The 38th Luna Awards ceremony, presented by the Film Academy of the Philippines (FAP), honored the best Filipino films of 2019. Because of the coronavirus pandemic, it took place online via livestream on December 18, 2020, and was broadcast on UNTV.

Winners and nominees

Awards 
Winners are listed first, highlighted in boldface.

Special Awards 
The following honorary awards were also awarded.

 Lamberto Avellana Memorial Award – German Moreno
 Fernando Poe Lifetime Achievement Award – Arsenio Lizaso

References 

Award ceremonies in the Philippines
2020 film awards
Luna Awards